Hussein Al-Tahan (born 1955 in Baghdad) was the governor of Baghdad in Iraq from  2005 to 2009.

References 

1955 births
Governors of Baghdad Governorate
Iraqi politicians
Living people
Mayors of Baghdad
Date of birth missing (living people)